{{Speciesbox
| image = 
| image_caption =
| status = LC
| status_system = IUCN3.1
| status_ref = <ref name= iucn>{{cite iucn | author1 = Carpenter, K.E. | author2 =  Smith-Vaniz, W.F. | name-list-style = amp | year = 2016 | title = Siganus woodlandi |errata=2017 | page = e.T69738962A115472510 | doi = 10.2305/IUCN.UK.2016-3.RLTS.T69738962A69742654.en | access-date = 7 September 2021}}</ref>
| taxon = Siganus woodlandi
| authority = Randall & Kulbicki, 2005
| synonyms_ref =
}}Siganus woodlandi is a species of marine ray-finned fish, a rabbitfish belonging to the family Siganidae. It is endemic to the waters off New Caledonia in the Western Pacific Ocean.

TaxonomySiganus woodlandi was first formally described in 2005 by the ichthyologists John Ernest Randall & Michel Kulbicki with the type locality given as the fish market in Noumea in New Caledonia. The specific name honours the ichthyologist David J. Woodland of University of New England in New South Wales, Australia, in recognition of his research on the systematics of the family Siganidae.

DescriptionSiganus woodlandi has a compressed body which has a depth which fits into its standard length 2.3 to 2.4 times. The dorsal profile of the head is concave with a procumbermt spine in the nape in front of the dorsal fin. The caudal fin is strongly emarginate. Like all rabbitfishes, the dorsal fin has 13 spines and 10 soft rays while the anal fin has 7 spines and 9 soft rays. The fin spines hold venom glands. The head and body are pale blue in colour with numerous small pale yellowish spots and highly irregular narrow yellow bands, these create a fine reticulated pattern over much of the head and body.

BiologySiganis woodlandi is found in schools of about 10 to 100 fishes. They feed mainly on benthic algae, but they seem to opportunistically feed on zooplankton too.

FisheriesSiganis woodlandi'' was described from a specimen obtained at a fish market, so it occasionally appears to be caught and sold as food.

References

Fish described in 2005
Siganidae
Taxa named by John Ernest Randall